Moudge might refer to:

 Moudge-class frigate, an Iranian frigate class. The Iranian calls it a destroyer class but size indicates it is a frigate.
 Moudge I, the first ship of the Moudge class. This is the first large warship built in Iran. Also known as Iranian frigate Jamaran.
 Moudge II, the second ship of the Moudge class. Also known as Iranian frigate Damavand.
 , The Persian word for Wave

Persian words and phrases